Arctia mirifica is a moth in the family Erebidae. It was described by Charles Oberthür in 1892. It is found in western China, Tibet and north-western India.

This species, along with the others of the genus Preparctia, was moved to Arctia as a result of phylogenetic research published by Rönkä et al. in 2016.

References

Moths described in 1892
Arctiini